Upwey railway station is located on the Belgrave line in Victoria, Australia. It serves the eastern Melbourne suburb of Upwey, and opened on 3 June 1901.

The station is a crossing loop in the middle of a six-kilometre section of single track between Ferntree Gully and Belgrave.

History
Upwey station opened on 3 June 1901 and, like the suburb itself, was named after the homestead "Upwey", which was named by a local family who purchased the property in 1897. The name itself comes from Upwey in Dorset, England, which is located on the River Wey.

Upwey was originally on the Upper Ferntree Gully – Gembrook narrow-gauge line. On 30 April 1954, the station, along with the rest of the line, was closed to traffic. On 19 February 1962, Upwey reopened, when the line as far as Belgrave was converted to broad gauge and electrified. On 17 March 1964, the current island platform was provided, when the present day Platform 2 was brought into use.

On 4 May 2010, as part of the 2010/2011 State Budget, $83.7 million was allocated to upgrade Upwey to a Premium Station, along with nineteen others. However, in March 2011, this was scrapped by the Baillieu Government.

Platforms and services
Upwey has one island platform with two faces. It is served by Belgrave line trains.

Platform 1:
  all stations and limited express services to Flinders Street; all stations shuttle services to Ringwood

Platform 2:
  all stations services to Belgrave

Transport links
Ventura Bus Lines operates two routes via Upwey station, under contract to Public Transport Victoria:
 : Belgrave station – Oakleigh station
 : to Belgrave station

References

External links
 
 Melway map at street-directory.com.au

Railway stations in Melbourne
Railway stations in Australia opened in 1901
Railway stations in the Shire of Yarra Ranges